LuBara Dixon "Dickey" Simpkins (born April 6, 1972) is an American former professional basketball player best known for his tenure with the Chicago Bulls in the late 1990s. He is currently a scout for the Washington Wizards.

A 6' 9" forward/center, Simpkins starred at Friendly High School (Maryland) and Providence College before being selected by the Bulls with the 21st pick in the 1994 NBA Draft. Behind Luc Longley, Bill Wennington, and later Dennis Rodman in the Bulls' playing rotation, he saw limited action in his first few seasons as a Bull, scoring 513 points in 167 games. He earned two NBA Championship rings in 1996 and 1997, but was not on the team's active roster for either playoff run, and in fall 1997 the Bulls traded him to the Golden State Warriors for guard/forward Scott Burrell.

The Warriors subsequently waived Simpkins, and the Bulls claimed him. Simpkins posted a .634 field goal percentage in 21 games, and in the spring of 1998 he participated in the playoffs for the first time of his career, earning his third championship ring.  After the 1998–99 NBA lockout, the Bulls parted ways with Michael Jordan, Scottie Pippen, Rodman and Luc Longley, which provided Simpkins with significantly more playing time. During the 1999 season he emerged as a part-time starter, averaging career highs of 9.1 points and 6.8 rebounds, and in the following season, he played a career-high 1,651 minutes.

After the Bulls signed Brad Miller in September 2000, the Bulls renounced their rights to Simpkins, who would spend a season in Greece before joining the Atlanta Hawks during the 2001–02 NBA season.  He only played one game for the Hawks, though, and spent the rest of the season in Greece and the CBA.  He later played in Russia, Puerto Rico, Lithuania, Spain, Philippines, Lebanon, and Germany. In 2005, Simpkins joined the Alaska Aces (PBA) of the Philippine Basketball Association as replacement for Leon Derricks. He led the team to a three-game quarterfinals loss against the sixth-seeded Red Bull franchise.

Simpkins has worked as a college basketball analyst for ESPN. He is the founder of the basketball development company Next Level Performance Inc. (NLP), and is a national motivational speaker. He is currently a color commentator at Fox Sports 1 (FS1) for the Big East games.

He was a scout for the Charlotte Hornets and the Washington Wizards.

NBA career statistics

Regular season 

|-
| style="text-align:left;"| 
| style="text-align:left;"|Chicago
| 59 || 5 || 9.9 || .424 || – || .694 || 2.6 || 0.6 || 0.2 || 0.1 || 3.5
|-
| style="text-align:left;background:#afe6ba;"| †
| style="text-align:left;"|Chicago
| 60 || 12 || 11.4 || .481 || 1.000 || .629 || 2.6 || 0.6 || 0.2 || 0.1 || 3.6
|-
| style="text-align:left;background:#afe6ba;"| †
| style="text-align:left;"|Chicago
| 48 || 0 || 8.2 || .333 || .250 || .700 || 1.9 || 0.6 || 0.1 || 0.1 || 1.9
|-
| style="text-align:left;"| 
| style="text-align:left;"|Golden State
| 19 || 0 || 10.3 || .458 || .000 || .385 || 2.4 || 0.8 || 0.3 || 0.1 || 2.8
|-
| style="text-align:left;background:#afe6ba;"| †
| style="text-align:left;"|Chicago
| 21 || 0 || 11.3 || .634 || .000 || .591 || 1.5 || 0.8 || 0.2 || 0.1 || 3.7
|-
| style="text-align:left;"| 
| style="text-align:left;"|Chicago
| 50 || 35 || 29.0 || .463 || .000 || .645 || 6.8 || 1.3 || 0.7 || 0.3 || 9.1
|-
| style="text-align:left;"| 
| style="text-align:left;"|Chicago
| 69 || 48 || 23.9 || .405 || .000 || .542 || 5.4 || 1.4 || 0.3 || 0.3 || 4.2
|-
| style="text-align:left;"| 
| style="text-align:left;"|Atlanta
| 1 || 0 || 3.0 || – || – || – || 0.0 || 1.0 || 0.0 || 0.0 || 0.0
|- class="sortbottom"
| style="text-align:center;" colspan="2"| Career
| 327 || 100 || 15.9 || .440 || .222 || .618 || 3.6 || 0.9 || 0.3 || 0.2 || 4.2

Playoffs 

|-
|style="text-align:left;"|1998
|style="text-align:left;"|Chicago
|13||0||5.7||.375||–||.444||1.0||0.2||0.2||0.1||1.2
|- class="sortbottom"
| style="text-align:center;" colspan="2"| Career
|13||0||5.7||.375||–||.444||1.0||0.2||0.2||0.1||1.2

References

External links

NBA Blog Squad
Eurobasket.com Profile

1972 births
Living people
African-American basketball players
Alaska Aces (PBA) players
American expatriate basketball people in Germany
American expatriate basketball people in Greece
American expatriate basketball people in Lebanon
American expatriate basketball people in Lithuania
American expatriate basketball people in Russia
American expatriate basketball people in Spain
American expatriate basketball people in the Philippines
American men's basketball players
Atlanta Hawks players
Basketball players from Maryland
BC Rytas players
BC UNICS players
Brose Bamberg players
Centers (basketball)
Chicago Bulls draft picks
Chicago Bulls players
College basketball announcers in the United States
Dakota Wizards (CBA) players
Golden State Warriors players
Leones de Ponce basketball players
Liga ACB players
Makedonikos B.C. players
Maroussi B.C. players
People from Fort Washington, Maryland
Philippine Basketball Association imports
Power forwards (basketball)
Providence Friars men's basketball players
Rockford Lightning players
Sportspeople from the Washington metropolitan area
21st-century African-American sportspeople
20th-century African-American sportspeople
Criollos de Caguas basketball players